Roadshow theatrical release is a practice in which a film opened in a limited number of theaters in large cities.

Road show or Road Show may also refer to:
Antiques Roadshow, a BBC TV series where antiques specialist travel around the country to appraise objects
Road Show (musical), a musical by Stephen Sondheim and John Weidman
Road Show (film), a 1941 film
The Road Show, a 1977 Canadian television series
Road Show (album), a 1960 album by the Stan Kenton Orchestra with June Christy and The Four Freshmen
RoadShow, a media company in Hong Kong
The Radio 1 Roadshow, a former summer event in the UK (1973-1999)

See also
Financial roadshows
Travelling exhibition